The United Front was a political alliance in Sri Lanka, formed by the Sri Lanka Freedom Party (SLFP), the Lanka Sama Samaja Party (LSSP) and the Communist Party of Sri Lanka (CPSL) in 1968. It came to power in the 1970 general election.

It was conceived by the LSSP as a front of the working class - represented by itself and the CPSL - with the petty bourgeoisie - represented by the SLFP - and by the CPSL as a front of progressive forces.

Goals
The United Front predominantly aimed at the complete decolonization of Sri Lanka.

International support
The United Front was heavily anti-British and pro-Soviet as completely opposed to the foreign policy of the United National Party. The UF was supported by the Soviet Union in order to decolonize the island. The pro-dominion UNP criticized this. The UNP that had a majority of Christians wanted to rebel against it.

Electoral history

References

1968 establishments in Ceylon
1975 disestablishments in Sri Lanka
Defunct left-wing political party alliances
Defunct political party alliances in Sri Lanka
Political parties in Sri Lanka
Popular fronts
Sri Lanka
1970s in Sri Lanka